The term stock number can have several meanings:

 In inorganic chemistry, it is an obsolete synonym of oxidation number. (See Stock nomenclature.)
 Stock numbers can also be reference numbers to identify a unique sheet of paper, such as tickets, paper money and giro forms.  Stock numbers are printed when the paper is manufactured, while additional unique numbers might be added later (airline ticket have both a pre-printed stock control number and a document number that is added when the ticket is issued).
 A identifying number used for a product available in a physical warehouse or inventory system.  A customer can order a product via a stock number; warehouse staff then use the stock number to find the location of the product (stock) with a product location system, and pull and ship the product to the ordering customer.  A part number.